Van Meter State Park is a public recreation area on the Missouri River in Saline County, Missouri. The park has several archaeological sites, a cultural center, and facilities for camping, hiking, and fishing. It is managed by the Missouri Department of Natural Resources.

History
The park and surrounding lands were once the home of the Native American tribe known to French settlers as “Oumessourit,” or Missouri Indians. Signs of the land's first occupants include the remnants of a Native American village, known as the Utz Site, a sizeable earthworks named Old Fort, and a mound field. Utz Site and Old Fort are included in the National Register of Historic Places.

The park originated when Annie Vanmeter deeded 369 acres to the state in 1932. The Civilian Conservation Corps was active in the park from 1934 to 1935. The large shelter house and the small shelter house in the Walnut Grove that survive from that era have been added to the National Register of Historic Places.

Activities and amenities
The area's native history is interpreted in the park's cultural center through exhibits and murals. Park recreational activities include camping, hiking, and fishing on an  lake.

References

External links
Van Meter State Park Missouri Department of Natural Resources
Van Meter State Park Map Missouri Department of Natural Resources

State parks of Missouri
Protected areas of Saline County, Missouri
Protected areas established in 1932
Civilian Conservation Corps in Missouri
Event venues on the National Register of Historic Places in Missouri
Buildings and structures in Saline County, Missouri
National Register of Historic Places in Saline County, Missouri
1932 establishments in Missouri